Joseph Broussard (1702–1765), also known as Beausoleil, was a leader of the Acadian people in Acadia; later Nova Scotia, Prince Edward Island, and New Brunswick. Broussard organized a Mi'kmaq and Acadian militias against the British through King George's War, Father Le Loutre's War and during the Seven Year's War. After Acadia was captured by the British, he eventually led the first group of Acadians to southern Louisiana in the present-day United States. His name is sometimes presented as Joseph Gaurhept Broussard; this is likely the result of a transcription error. Broussard is widely regarded as a hero and an important historical figure by both Acadians and Cajuns.

Life
Broussard was born in Port-Royal, Acadia in 1702 to Jean-François Broussard and Catherine Richard. His father came from Poitiers and his mother was born in Port Royal. He lived much of his life at Le Cran (present-day Stoney Creek, Albert County, New Brunswick), along the Petitcodiac River with his wife Agnes and their eleven children.

During Father Rale's War, Broussard participated in a raid on Annapolis Royal, Nova Scotia (1724).

King George's War

During King George's War, under the leadership of French priest Jean-Louis Le Loutre, Broussard began a resistance movement against British rule in Acadia. Broussard's forces frequently included Mi'kmaq militia, long-time allies of the Acadians. In 1747 he participated in and was later charged for his involvement with the Battle of Grand Pré.

Father Le Loutre's War
During Father Le Loutre's War, after the construction of Fort Beausejour in 1751, Broussard joined Jean-Louis Le Loutre at Beausejour. In an effort to stop the emigration of British settlers into Acadia, in 1749 Broussard was involved in one of the first raids on Dartmouth, Nova Scotia which resulted in the deaths of five British settlers. The following year, Broussard was in the Battle at Chignecto and then shortly afterward he led sixty Mi'kmaq and Acadians to attack Dartmouth again, in what would be known as the "Dartmouth Massacre" (1751). Broussard and the others killed twenty British settlers and took a few as prisoners. Cornwallis temporarily abandoned plans to settle Dartmouth.

In late April 1754, Beausoleil and a large band of Mi'kmaq and Acadians left Chignecto for Lawrencetown.  They arrived in mid-May and in the night opened fired on the village.  Beausoleil killed and scalped four British settlers and two soldiers. By August, as the raids continued, the residents and soldiers were withdrawn to Halifax.

In the action of 8 June 1755, a naval battle off Cape Race, Newfoundland, on board the French ships Alcide and Lys were found 10,000 scalping knives for Acadians and Indians serving under Chief Jean-Baptiste Cope and Acadian Beausoleil as they continue to fight Father Le Loutre's War.

Broussard was also active in the fight against Lieutenant Colonel Robert Monckton in the Battle of Beausejour.

Seven Year's War
With Le Loutre imprisoned after the Battle of Beausejour, Broussard became the leader of the Acadian resistance to the expulsion of the Acadians (1755–1764), leading assaults against the British on several occasions between 1755 and 1758 as part of the forces of Charles Deschamps de Boishébert et de Raffetot.
After arming a ship in 1758, Broussard traveled through the upper Bay of Fundy region, where he attacked British settlements. His ship was seized in November 1758. He was then forced to flee, travelling first to the Miramichi and later imprisoned at Fort Edward in 1762. Finally, he was transferred and imprisoned with other Acadians in Halifax, Nova Scotia.

Arrival at Louisiana
Released in 1764, the year after the signing of the Treaty of Paris, Broussard left Nova Scotia, along with his family and hundreds of other Acadians, to Saint-Domingue (present-day Haiti). Unable to adapt to the climate and diseases that were killing Acadians, he led the group to settle in Louisiana.

He was among the first 200 Acadians to arrive in Louisiana on February 27, 1765, aboard the Santo Domingo. On April 8, 1765, he was appointed militia captain and commander of the "Acadians of the Atakapas" the area around present-day St. Martinville. Not long after his arrival, Joseph Broussard died near what is now St. Martinville at the presumed age of 63. The exact date of his death is unknown, but it is assumed to have been on or about October 20, 1765. Many of his descendants live in southern Louisiana and Nova Scotia.

Descendancy
Broussard's children and grandchildren generally remained in Louisiana, integrating into the slave-owning upper classes of the colony. His 21st-century descendants include Celestine "Tina" Knowles and her two daughters Beyoncé and Solange.

Modern cultural references
The Cajun music group BeauSoleil is named in honor of Broussard.

A New Brunswick group "Beausoleil Broussard" was very popular in the 1970s.

Broussard is a character in the novel Banished from Our Home: The Acadian Diary of Angelique Richard, Grand-Pre, Acadia, 1755 (2004) by Sharon Stewart.

A dramatized, historically inaccurate version of Beausoleil is featured in the Acadian novel Pélagie-la-Charette, by Antonine Maillet.

Part of his militant Acadian hero story is told in the documentary feature "Zachary Richard, Cajun Heart" by Acadian director Phil Comeau.

See also
Military history of Nova Scotia
Military history of the Acadians

References

Further reading
 
 
  – published in the United States as The Cajuns: A People's Story of Exile and Triumph
 
 

Military history of Acadia
Nova Scotia
Military history of New England
Military history of the Thirteen Colonies
Canadian military personnel from New Brunswick
Acadian people
French Canadian people of the French and Indian War
People deported from Canada
French slave owners
18th-century pirates
1702 births
1765 deaths
People of Colonial Spanish Louisiana
People from Albert County, New Brunswick
Date of death unknown
Date of birth unknown
People of Father Le Loutre's War